Egon Henninger (born 22 June 1940) is a German former swimmer. He competed at the 1960, 1964 and 1968 Summer Olympics in the 200 m breaststroke and finished in fourth, fifth and sixth place, respectively. He won silver medals in the 4 × 100 m medley relay in 1964 and 1968. He won three medals in these two swimming events at the European championships in 1962 and 1966.

References

1940 births
Living people
German male swimmers
German male breaststroke swimmers
Olympic swimmers of the United Team of Germany
Olympic swimmers of East Germany
Swimmers at the 1960 Summer Olympics
Swimmers at the 1964 Summer Olympics
Swimmers at the 1968 Summer Olympics
Olympic silver medalists for the United Team of Germany
Olympic silver medalists for East Germany
World record setters in swimming
European Aquatics Championships medalists in swimming
Medalists at the 1968 Summer Olympics
Medalists at the 1964 Summer Olympics
Olympic silver medalists in swimming
20th-century German people